Lung Mei is the name of several places in Hong Kong, including:
 Lung Mei, Sai Kung District in Sai Kung District
 Lung Mei, Tai Po District in Tai Po District